The Smoot Theatre is a historic vaudeville house and movie theater located in Parkersburg, Wood County, West Virginia.  It was built in 1926, and is a brick and terra cotta building with a simple Classical style front. It features a Greek key cornice and a second story inset with four fluted columns in antis.

It was listed on the National Register of Historic Places in 1982.

References

External links
Smoot Theatre website

Buildings and structures in Parkersburg, West Virginia
Theatres on the National Register of Historic Places in West Virginia
Neoclassical architecture in West Virginia
Theatres completed in 1926
1926 establishments in West Virginia
National Register of Historic Places in Wood County, West Virginia